Rhabdodiscus is a genus of script lichens in the family Graphidaceae. It has 36 species.

Taxonomy
The genus was circumscribed by Finnish lichenologist Edvard August Vainio in 1921. The species of this genus were previously classified in genus Stegobolus, until molecular phylogenetic analysis showed that Stegobolus and Rhabdodiscus formed two separate, distantly related clades. Rhabdodiscus was formally reinstated in 2012 to contain the formers members of the Stegobolus auberianus species group.

Description
Rhabdodiscus is characterised by having a distinctly carbonized (blackened) apothecia with thin margins that lack a felt-like pruina. In contrast, Stegobolus species have apothecia that are either uncarbonized to weakly carbonized, and have thick margins with felty pruina on the inner side.

Species
, Species Fungorum accepts 36 species of Rhabdodiscus.
Rhabdodiscus albodenticulatus 
Rhabdodiscus argentinensis 
Rhabdodiscus asiaticus 
Rhabdodiscus bakoensis 
Rhabdodiscus caracasanus 
Rhabdodiscus crassoides 
Rhabdodiscus crassus 
Rhabdodiscus emersellus 
Rhabdodiscus emersus 
Rhabdodiscus exutus 
Rhabdodiscus farinosus 
Rhabdodiscus feigei 
Rhabdodiscus granulosus 
Rhabdodiscus inalbescens 
Rhabdodiscus indicus 
Rhabdodiscus inspersus 
Rhabdodiscus integer 
Rhabdodiscus isidiatus  – Sri Lanka
Rhabdodiscus isidiifer 
Rhabdodiscus kinabalensis 
Rhabdodiscus korupensis 
Rhabdodiscus lankaensis 
Rhabdodiscus marivelensis 
Rhabdodiscus neocaledonicus 
Rhabdodiscus parnmenianus 
Rhabdodiscus planus 
Rhabdodiscus ramificans 
Rhabdodiscus reconditus 
Rhabdodiscus saxicola 
Rhabdodiscus schizostomus 
Rhabdodiscus subcavatus 
Rhabdodiscus subemersus 
Rhabdodiscus tanzanicus 
Rhabdodiscus thouvenotii 
Rhabdodiscus trinitatis 
Rhabdodiscus verrucoisidiatus

References

Graphidaceae
Lichen genera
Taxa described in 1921
Taxa named by Edvard August Vainio
Ostropales genera